The 2010 PTT Pattaya Open was a women's professional tennis tournament played on outdoor hard courts. It was the 19th edition of the PTT Pattaya Open (formerly known as the Pattaya Women's Open) and was part of the International category on the 2010 WTA Tour. It took place at Dusit Thani Hotel in Pattaya, Thailand from 7 February through 14 February 2010.

The top two seeds were the defending champion Vera Zvonareva, Wimbledon quarterfinalist Sabine Lisicki. Vera Dushevina, 2007 champion Sybille Bammer and home favourite Tamarine Tanasugarn competed too.

First-seeded Vera Zvonareva won her second consecutive singles title at the event and earned $37,000 fist-prize money.

WTA entrants

Seeds

1 Rankings as of February 1, 2010.

Other entrants
The following players received wildcards into the main draw:
 Noppawan Lertcheewakarn
 Suchanan Viratprasert
 Varatchaya Wongteanchai

The following players received entry from the qualifying draw:
 Anna Gerasimou
 Sacha Jones
 Nudnida Luangnam
 Zhou Yi-Miao

Finals

Singles

 Vera Zvonareva defeated  Tamarine Tanasugarn, 6–4, 6–4
It was Zvonareva's first title of the year, 10th of her career, and her second consecutive title at the event.

Doubles

 Marina Erakovic /  Tamarine Tanasugarn defeated  Anna Chakvetadze /  Ksenia Pervak, 7–5, 6–1

References

External links
 Tournament draws

 
 WTA Tour
 in women's tennis
Tennis, WTA Tour, PTT Pattaya Open
Tennis, WTA Tour, PTT Pattaya Open

Tennis, WTA Tour, PTT Pattaya Open